Janet Constance Elizabeth Watson (born 1959) is a linguist and phonologist. She is Professor in the School of Languages, Cultures, and Societies at the University of Leeds.

Biography
Watson studied Arabic and Islamic Studies at the University of Exeter before undertaking her PhD in Linguistics at the SOAS University of London.

Watson is on the steering committee and editorial board for the Seminar of Arabian Studies, the editorial board of the Journal of Semitic Studies, and the advisory board of the Zeitschrift für Arabische Linguistik.

She was elected as a fellow of the British Academy in 2013.

References

External links
Presentation by Janet Watson: Beauty and diversity-Language and Nature in Southern Arabia

1959 births
Fellows of the British Academy
Linguists from the United Kingdom
British phonologists
Academics of the University of Leeds
Women linguists
British women academics
Living people